Carex tristis is a species of sedge (family Cyperaceae), native to the Caucasus Mountains and adjoining areas. It is the most abundant plant species found on summits.

References

tristis
Flora of the Caucasus
Flora of Turkey
Flora of Iran
Plants described in 1819